Hanina was a second and third generation Amora Sage of the Land of Israel.

Hanina may also refer to:

 Hananiah, a given name
 "Hanina", a song by Mohamed Mounir from his 2003 album Ahmar Shafayef
 Hanina Segan ha-Kohanim, a first generation Jewish Tanna sage